Fu Xiaofang (born 6 May 1986) is a Chinese professional pool player. Fu is best known for winning the 2010 WPA World Nine-ball Championship.

Biography

Fu was born into a peasant family in Bailou, in Lankao County, China. In 2002, aged 15, she travelled to her uncle's pool hall in Heilongjiang province to learn how to play pool. She moved to Beijing in 2004 to develop her game, and was coached by Zhang Shuchung. A year later, in 2005, she won her first national pool title.

Fu won bronze medals at the Asian Indoor Games in 2009 and at the Asian Games in 2010.

In 2010 she won the WPA World Nine-ball Championship with a 9–7 victory over Allison Fisher. Two years later, she was the runner-up, beaten in the final 6–9 by Kelly Fisher.

Achievements
2010 WPA Women's World Nine-ball Championship
2011 China Open 9-Ball Championship
 2014 WPA World Team Championship
2017 CBSA World Chinese Eight-ball Championship
2018 China Open 9-Ball Championship

References

External links

Living people
female pool players
Chinese pool players 
1986 births
People from Lankao County
Asian Games medalists in cue sports
Cue sports players at the 2010 Asian Games
Asian Games bronze medalists for China
Medalists at the 2010 Asian Games
21st-century Chinese women